Acharya crassicornis is a moth of the family Erebidae first described by Frederic Moore in 1882. It is found in India.

References

Moths described in 1882
Calpinae
Moths of Asia